The list shows flags for the forty-seven counties of Kenya. Some counties adopted the flag of the defunct municipal or district governments. Other flags adopted in the year after the first county governments were elected which was between 4 March 2013 to the same date on 2014. As of 17 December 2014, not all county assemblies have passed the design of the county flags. It is expected that all counties will adopt their own flags soon.

Current county flags

Former county flags

See also 
Coat of arms of Kenyan Counties

References

Counties of Kenya
Kenyan counties
Flags
Kenya